The Roman Catholic Diocese of Daejeon (Hangul: 천주교 대전교구) is a diocese of the Latin Church of the Catholic church in South Korea. It is the diocese for Daejeon, South Korea. Augustinus Kim Jong-soo has been appointed its bishop; Stephanus Han Jung-hyun is auxiliary bishop.

History
On 23 June 1958  Pope Pius XII erected the apostolic vicariate of Daejeon. The vicariate was made a diocese on 10 March 1962 by Pope John XXIII.

Leadership

Ordinaries
Apostolic Vicars of Daijeon
Adrien-Joseph Larribeau, M.E.P. (1958–1962)

Bishops of Daejeon
Adrien-Joseph Larribeau, M.E.P. (1962–1965)
Peter Hwang Min Syeng (1965–1984)
Joseph Kyeong Kap-ryong (1984–2005)
Lazarus You Heung-sik (2005–2021)
Augustinus Kim Jong-soo (2022–present)

Coadjutor bishops
Lazarus You Heung-sik (2003–2005)

Auxiliary bishops
Augustinus Kim Jong-soo (2009–2022)
Stephanus Han Jung-hyun (2020–present)

References

Christian organizations established in 1958
Daejeon
Daejon
Daejeon
1958 establishments in South Korea
Roman Catholic Ecclesiastical Province of Seoul